Shatha Mousa Sadiq al-Musawi is of a very well known family of Iraqi scholars and poets known as 'Aal El Hindi, descendants of Imam Ali al-Hadi, the 10th Shi'a Imam. 

She was elected to Iraq's transitional National Assembly in January 2005 and to the Council of Representatives in December 2005, as a candidate for the United Iraqi Alliance.

References 

Living people
Members of the Council of Representatives of Iraq
21st-century Iraqi women politicians
21st-century Iraqi politicians
Year of birth missing (living people)